A Trypanosomiasis vaccine is a vaccine against trypanosomiasis. No effective vaccine currently exists, but development of a vaccine is the subject of current research.

The Bill & Melinda Gates Foundation has been involved in funding research conducted by the Sabin Vaccine Institute and others.

There are many obstacles to development of such a vaccine. One obstacle is variant surface glycoprotein which makes it difficult for the immune system to recognize the infectious organism. Also, Trypanosoma brucei has a direct inhibitory effect upon B cells.

It has been suggested that these challenges could be overcome by a vaccine against the initial antigens, or generating an immune response against the cysteine protease (for example, cruzipain).

An effective vaccine was achieved in 2021 using a mouse model of infection with Trypanosoma vivax.

See also
 Eradication of infectious diseases#African trypanosomiasis
 Trypanocidal agent

References

Vaccines